Prudence on Broadway is a lost 1919 American silent comedy film directed by Frank Borzage  and starring Olive Thomas. It was produced and distributed by the Triangle Film Corporation.

Cast
Olive Thomas as Prudence
Francis McDonald as Grayson Mills
Harvey Clark as John Melbourne
J. P. Wild as John Ogilvie
Alberta Lee as Mrs. Ogilvie
Lillian West as Mrs. Allen Wentworth
Edward Peil Sr. as Mr. Wentworth
Mary Warren as Kitty
Lillian Langdon as Mrs. Melbourne
Claire McDowell as Miss Grayson

References

External links

1919 films
American silent feature films
Lost American films
Triangle Film Corporation films
Films directed by Frank Borzage
American black-and-white films
Silent American comedy films
1919 comedy films
1919 lost films
Lost comedy films
1910s American films